Cléber Santana Loureiro (27 June 1981 – 28 November 2016) was a Brazilian professional footballer who played as a central midfielder.

He won state championships with Sport, Vitória, Santos and Avaí. He also had spells abroad, with Kashiwa Reysol in Japan and Atlético Madrid and Mallorca in Spain.

Santana was the captain of the Chapecoense team aboard LaMia Flight 2933 that crashed, killing him and 70 others.

Football career
Born in Abreu e Lima, Pernambuco, Santana started playing professionally with Sport Club do Recife. He then went on to represent in Brazil Esporte Clube Vitória and Santos FC, punctuated by a stint with J1 League's Kashiwa Reysol in 2005.

In July 2007, Santana was signed from Santos by Atlético Madrid, on a three-year contract worth €6 million. Although not an undisputed starter, he still contributed with 23 league matches as the Colchoneros returned to the UEFA Champions League after a 12-year hiatus, being played mostly after Maniche's loan departure to Inter Milan in January 2008.

For the 2008–09 season, Santana was loaned to fellow La Liga club RCD Mallorca. On 9 November 2008 he scored his first goal for the Balearic Islands team, in a 3–3 home draw against Athletic Bilbao, and finished the campaign (in which he featured heavily, alongside another player loaned by Atlético, José Manuel Jurado) with five, which also included the 2–1 winner against already crowned champions FC Barcelona on 17 May 2009, and a solo effort the following week, a 3–1 triumph at Real Madrid.

Cléber then returned to Atlético, being used sparingly but managing to net in a 2–2 home draw against UD Almería, on 23 September 2009. In late January of the following year, even though he had renewed his contract until June 2012, he returned to his country, signing with São Paulo FC.

On 21 September 2012, Santana was announced at Clube de Regatas do Flamengo, claiming the team could "not afford to think about relegation" even though it was playing below the general expectations – going on to finish in 11th position. He signed a two-year contract, and the Rio de Janeiro side bought 70% of his rights; he scored on his official debut two days later, against Atlético Clube Goianiense for the Série A.

In the following years, Santana represented Avaí Futebol Clube in the Série B, Criciúma Esporte Clube in that level and also Série A and Associação Chapecoense de Futebol in the top division. He captained the latter, helping the Santa Catarina-based team to the finals of the 2016 Copa Sudamericana.

Death
On 28 November 2016, whilst travelling with Chapecoense to the aforementioned finals, 35-year-old Santana was among the fatalities of the LaMia Flight 2933 accident in the Colombian village of Cerro Gordo, La Unión, Antioquia.

Career statistics

Honours
Sport
Copa Nordeste: 2000
Campeonato Pernambucano: 2000

Vitória
Campeonato Baiano: 2004

Santos
Campeonato Paulista: 2006, 2007

Atlético Madrid
UEFA Intertoto Cup: 2007
Copa del Rey: Runner-up 2009–10

Avaí
Campeonato Catarinense: 2012

Chapecoense
Copa Sudamericana: 2016 (posthumously)
Campeonato Catarinense: 2016

References

External links

1981 births
2016 deaths
Brazilian footballers
Association football midfielders
Campeonato Brasileiro Série A players
Campeonato Brasileiro Série B players
Sport Club do Recife players
Esporte Clube Vitória players
Santos FC players
São Paulo FC players
Club Athletico Paranaense players
Avaí FC players
CR Flamengo footballers
Criciúma Esporte Clube players
Associação Chapecoense de Futebol players
J1 League players
Kashiwa Reysol players
La Liga players
Atlético Madrid footballers
RCD Mallorca players
Brazilian expatriate footballers
Expatriate footballers in Japan
Expatriate footballers in Spain
Brazilian expatriate sportspeople in Spain
Footballers killed in the LaMia Flight 2933 crash